The Hoboken Land and Improvement Company Building, is located in Hoboken, Hudson County, New Jersey, United States. The building was designed by Charles Fall and was built by Myles Tierney in 1889. The building was added to the National Register of Historic Places on July 3, 1979. The building housed the offices of the Stevens family real estate holding corporation the Hoboken Land and Improvement Company. The building is notable for its high quality brickwork, with recessed panels and contrasting color mortars.

See also
National Register of Historic Places listings in Hudson County, New Jersey
John Den, ex dem. James B. Murray et al. v. The Hoboken Land and Improvement Company

References

Buildings and structures in Hoboken, New Jersey
Commercial buildings on the National Register of Historic Places in New Jersey
Commercial buildings completed in 1889
National Register of Historic Places in Hudson County, New Jersey
New Jersey Register of Historic Places